Cyril Beech (12 March 1925 – May 2001) was an English footballer who played in the Football League for Newport County and Swansea Town. His brother Gilbert was also a professional footballer and played with Cyril at Swansea.

After his time at Hereford he also played for Merthyr Tydfil again, Brecon Corinthians and Brierley Hill.

References

1925 births
2001 deaths
Sportspeople from Tamworth, Staffordshire
English footballers
Association football wingers
Merthyr Tydfil F.C. players
Swansea City A.F.C. players
Worcester City F.C. players
Newport County A.F.C. players
Hereford United F.C. players
English Football League players
Brecon Corinthians F.C. players